Rhenosterkop Dam is combined gravity and arch type dam in Mpumalanga Province, South Africa. It is located on the Elands River, part of the Olifants River basin. The dam was established in 1984.

The dam mainly serves for municipal and industrial use and its hazard potential has been ranked high (3).

See also
List of reservoirs and dams in South Africa

References 

Dams in South Africa
Dams completed in 1984
Olifants River (Limpopo)